The First Yale Unit was started by then Yale sophomore F. Trubee Davison in 1915. The First Yale Unit is considered to be the first naval air reserve unit. Davison and 11 other Yale students were fascinated with the possibilities of aviation in general and of naval aviation specifically. After meeting with Admiral Robert Peary to gain authorization for the unit, Trubee Davison acquired a Curtiss Model F flying boat and members of the First Yale Unit were trained as pilots during the summer of 1916. They were used as the first aerial coastal patrol unit.

Though they were still civilians and volunteers, the Yale students now had an official mission. On August 29, 1916, Congress passed the Naval Reserve Appropriations Act and established the Naval Reserve Flying Corps. In March 1917, 13 days before the United States entered World War I, the First Yale Unit volunteers enlisted en masse.

From this small group of 29 emerged an Assistant Secretary of War, an Undersecretary of the Navy and a Secretary of Defense. Lt. David Ingalls, a member of the First Yale Unit, flying a Sopwith Camel with the RAF, was the first US naval aviator to become an ace. He later served as Assistant Secretary of the Navy. Trubee Davison was injured in a crash during training and never saw combat. However, he went on to become the director of the Civil Aeronautics Board. First Yale Unit members Robert Lovett and Artemus Gates became commandants of the Army and Navy air corps, respectively.

The story of The First Yale Unit is chronicled in the 2015 documentary film The Millionaire's Unit, based on author Marc Wortman's book of the same name.

References

Further reading
 Ralph Delahaye Paine, The First Yale Unit. 679pp, Cambridge, 1925. ▸ Full transcription online
 Marc Wortman, The Millionaires' Unit: The Aristocratic Flyboys who Fought the Great War and Invented America's Airpower. New York : Public Affairs, 2006. 
 Phil MARZAT, Moutchic NAS The First Yale Unit. ▸ Original photo and video of the first yale unit at le Moutchic on the Lacanau Lake

Military units and formations of the United States Navy Reserve
Islip (town), New York
Yale University
1915 establishments in the United States
United States naval aviation